Joseph Oluwole "Wole" Odegbami (born 5 October 1962) is a Nigerian former professional footballer who played as a forward. A member of the Nigeria national team, he scored twice in 18 appearances for his country. He is the younger brother of Segun Odegbami, and was a member of the team that competed at the 1988 Summer Olympics in Seoul, South Korea.

He played for four seasons in Cyprus, for EPA Larnaca and Paralimni, and then moved on in 1993 to VSE St. Pölten in the Austrian Bundesliga. In the 1994–95 season, he had trials in England with Millwall and Wimbledon, but was not offered a contract.

Odegbami also played for English non-League sides, Dulwich Hamlet, Bromley, Grays Athletic and Purfleet.

External links
 

1962 births
Living people
Yoruba sportspeople
Nigerian footballers
Association football forwards
Nigeria international footballers
1988 African Cup of Nations players
Olympic footballers of Nigeria
Footballers at the 1988 Summer Olympics
Cypriot First Division players
Enosis Neon Paralimni FC players
Grays Athletic F.C. players
Nigerian expatriate footballers
Nigerian expatriate sportspeople in Cyprus
Expatriate footballers in Cyprus